Misgav, Misgab (lit. fortress) may refer to the following:

 Misgav Regional Council (Mo'atza Azorit Misgav), a regional council in Israel
 Misgav Am, a kibbutz in Israel
 Misgav Dov, a moshav near Gedera
 Misgav Ladach, a private, limited-service hospital in Jerusalem

 Related words
 Segev (same word root)